Bacon is an unincorporated community in Southeast Township, Orange County, in the U.S. state of Indiana.

History
A post office was established at Bacon in 1904, and remained in operation until it was discontinued in 1935.

Geography

References

Unincorporated communities in Orange County, Indiana
Unincorporated communities in Indiana